Northwest Orient Airlines Flight 6231 was the fatal crash of a Boeing 727 on December 1, 1974 in Harriman State Park near Stony Point, New York, just north of the New York City area. The Northwest Airlines 727 had been chartered to pick up the Baltimore Colts professional football team in Buffalo in western New York.

All three crew members on board died when the aircraft struck the ground following a stall and rapid descent caused by the crew's reaction to erroneous airspeed readings caused by atmospheric icing. The icing occurred due to failure to turn on the pitot tube heating at the start of the flight. This was one of two Boeing 727s to crash in the United States that day; the other was TWA Flight 514 in northern Virginia, northwest of Dulles airport (250 miles to the southeast).

Aircraft
The Boeing 727-251, registration N274US, was certificated and maintained in accordance with FAA regulations and requirements at the time of the crash.

Accident
The flight was chartered to pick up the Baltimore Colts in Buffalo after the aircraft originally earmarked to transport the team was grounded by a snowstorm in Detroit.

Flight 6231 departed New York City's John F. Kennedy International Airport at 19:14 EST (00:14 UTC) for a ferry flight to Buffalo. As the craft climbed past , the overspeed warning horn sounded, followed 10 seconds later by a stick shaker stall warning.

At 19:24:42 (00:24:42 UTC), Flight 6231 issued a "Mayday" call to New York air traffic control, and stated "...we're out of control, descending through ." After giving interim altitude clearance, at 19:25:21 (00:25:21 UTC), the controller inquired as to what the problem was, and a crewmember responded once more, "We're descending through [], we're in a stall." The crew of Flight 6231 attempted to make one final transmission 19 seconds prior to impact, but it was not received.

Flight 6231 struck the ground in a slightly nose down and right wing-down attitude twelve minutes after take-off, at 19:25:57 (00:25:57 UTC). There were no witnesses to the crash.

Police described the crash site as a heavily wooded marshy area and accessibility was hampered by winter weather conditions including wind and a rain-snow mix. Despite the 727's full load of fuel, there was no explosion or fire when the plane hit the ground, and there was no post-crash fire, although police described the crash site having a "strong smell of jet fuel."

Crew
The aircraft had three crewmembers on board. Captain John B. Lagorio, age 35, had worked for Northwest for almost nine years. He had just under 7,500 flying hours flying experience, with just under 2,000 hours total time flying the Boeing 727. The first officer, Walter A. Zadra, 32, had been working for Northwest for almost seven years. He had about 4,700 hours flying experience, of which two-thirds was as a second officer (flight engineer). His Boeing 727 experience amounted to about 1,250 hours, but only 46 of that was as a pilot – the other 1,200 hours experience was as a flight engineer. The second officer, James F. Cox, 33, had been with the airline for almost six years and had 1,600 hours experience as a Boeing 727 Flight Engineer.

Investigation

The National Transportation Safety Board (NTSB) led the accident investigation and released its final report on August 13, 1975.

Investigators found that the flightcrew had not activated the pitot head heaters and the pitot tubes had become blocked with ice which caused the crew to receive incorrect airspeed readings. The crew, believing the readings were true, pulled back on the control column and raised the nose, which caused the aircraft to stall.

From the NTSB report's abstract:
...the probable cause of this accident was the loss of control of the aircraft because the flightcrew failed to recognize and correct the aircraft's high angle of attack, low-speed stall and its descending spiral. The stall was precipitated by the flightcrew's improper reaction to erroneous airspeed and Mach indications which had resulted from a blockage of the pitot heads by atmospheric icing.

When investigators analysed the 727's voice recorder, the recording revealed that the pilots believed that the shaking of the stick shaker mechanism was caused by the airliner reaching the speed of sound, and not a warning that it was going into a stall.

See also 

 Aeroperú Flight 603
 Birgenair Flight 301
 Austral Líneas Aéreas Flight 2553
 Air France Flight 447
 Air Algérie Flight 5017
 Saratov Airlines Flight 703
Indonesia Air Asia Flight 8501

References

External links

Picture of the accident aircraft

Accidents and incidents involving the Boeing 727
Aviation accidents and incidents in the United States in 1974
Airliner accidents and incidents caused by pilot error
6231
Airliner accidents and incidents in New York (state)
Rockland County, New York
1974 in New York (state)
Baltimore Colts
Airliner accidents and incidents caused by instrument failure
December 1974 events in the United States